Thumb tribe (or sometimes thumb generation) is the younger generation with members who are more adept at texting using their thumbs than talking on the phone. In 2002, a trend was identified among young people who used mobile phones for many activities, such as texting, email, entertainment, and conversations, as opposed to using keyboards with traditional desktop computers, and marked a shift in the favorite digit such that activities typically done by the forefinger, such as pointing at things or ringing doorbells, were now being done with the thumb. The term thumb tribe has been used by marketers to identify younger consumers and in politics to identify persons who are not part of the younger generation, such as American politician Mitt Romney, who in 2010 was said to have owned a mobile phone but not been able to use it dexterously. Researchers reported in 2002 that this had led to the thumb being physically stronger and more flexible for many young people. There are medical implications as well; excessive use of thumbs can lead to muscle pain and possible occupational problems.

The term thumb tribe was first used in Japan to identify the "younger generation of Japanese texters". Japanese youth used their keitai or mobile phone to download music, access Japan's version of Myspace called mixi, surf the web, check train timetables and so forth. This group is identified as a common source of smart mobs that assemble seemingly spontaneously. The Japanese texting style relies heavily on the thumb, according to a report in NBC News.

See also

 Generation Z
 Millennials
 Phubbing

References

Communication
Electronics and society
2002 neologisms

External links
 Why your smartphone is irresistible (and why it’s worth trying to resist), PBS Newshour. April 21, 2017. Psychologist Adam Alter.
The Amish use tech differently than you think. We should emulate them. Jeff Smith. The Washington Post. February 17, 2020.